Pabst Blue Ribbon, commonly abbreviated PBR, is an American lager beer sold by Pabst Brewing Company, established in Milwaukee, Wisconsin, in 1844 and currently based in San Antonio. Originally called Best Select, and then Pabst Select, the current name comes from the blue ribbons tied around the bottle neck between 1882 and 1916.

History

Gottlieb and Frederika Pabst and their twelve-year-old son Frederick arrived in the United States in 1848 and settled in Chicago where Frederick eventually found work on the ships of Lake Michigan. In 1862, Frederick married Maria Best, daughter of Philip Best, founder and owner of the Best Brewing Company, and in 1863 became a brewer at his father-in-law's brewery.

When Philip Best retired to Germany in 1867, Pabst and Emil Schandein – his sister-in-law's husband and the vice-president of Best Brewery – worked to transform the company into one of the nation's largest brewers, capitalizing on, among other things, the Great Chicago Fire of 1871 that destroyed nineteen Chicago breweries and helped position Milwaukee as the leading beer-producing city in the United States.  In 1889, Schandein died, leaving Pabst as president and his widow, Lisette Schandein, as vice-president. In 1890, Pabst changed the "Best" letterhead to "Pabst" and the Pabst Brewing Company officially began.

Brand name 

The company has historically claimed that its flagship beer was renamed Pabst Blue Ribbon following its win as "America's Best" at the World's Columbian Exposition in Chicago in 1893. Whether the brand actually won an award in 1893 is unclear.  Some contemporaneous accounts indicate that many vendors were frustrated by the fair's refusal to award such prizes. One account says that the only prizes awarded by the executive committee were bronze medals, in recognition of "some independent and essential excellence in the article displayed", rather than "merely to indicate the relative merits of competing exhibits". However, the beer had won many other awards at many other fairs – so many, in fact, that Captain Pabst had already started tying silk ribbons around every bottle. It was a time when beer bottles were more likely to be embossed than labeled and the ribbons were likely added at great cost to Pabst. But Pabst's display of pride was also a display of marketing savvy, as patrons started asking their bartenders for "the blue-ribbon beer."

Peak, decline, and revival 

Sales of Pabst peaked at 18 million barrels in 1977. In 1980 and 1981, the company had four different CEOs, and by 1982 it was fifth in beer sales in the U.S., dropping from third in 1980.

In 1996, Pabst headquarters left Milwaukee, and the company ended beer production at its main complex there. By 2001, the brand's sales were below a million barrels. That year, the company got a new CEO, Brian Kovalchuk, formerly the CFO of Benetton, and major changes at the company's marketing department were made.

In 2010, food industry executive C. Dean Metropoulos bought the company for a reported $250 million. In 2011, the U.S. Securities and Exchange Commission forced two advertising executives to cease efforts to raise $300 million to buy the Pabst Brewing Company. The two had raised over $200 million by crowdsourcing, collecting pledges via their website, Facebook, and Twitter. In November 2014, Eugene Kashper, an American beer entrepreneur, and TSG Consumer Partners acquired Pabst Brewing Company. In 2015, Pabst won the "best large brewing company of the year" award at the Great American Beer Festival.

Pabst Blue Ribbon is now available in several international markets, including Australia (where it is brewed locally), Canada, Ukraine, Russia, Dominican Republic, Brazil and China.

On October 8, 2020, the San Antonio Economic Development Foundation announced that Pabst is moving its headquarters from Los Angeles to San Antonio, Texas.

After a brief return, in 2020, Pabst announced it was again leaving Milwaukee, the city where it was founded, with the closing of the Captain Pabst Pilot House, a taproom and microbrewery which the company had opened in 2017 as part of a redevelopment of its historic brewery in the city. The city's name continues to be a prominent part of its branding, despite it having no direct presence in or current impact on the area.

Marketing

In the mid-1940s, the brand was the titular sponsor of the radio comedy show Blue Ribbon Town, starring Groucho Marx. It later was a sponsor of the radio mystery show Night Beat in the early 1950s.

The beer experienced a sales revival in the early 2000s after a two-decade-long slump, largely due to its increasing popularity among urban hipsters. Although the Pabst website features user-submitted photography, much of which features twenty-something Pabst drinkers dressed in alternative fashions, the company has opted not to fully embrace the countercultural label in its marketing, fearing that doing so could jeopardize the very "authenticity" that made the brand popular (as was the case with the poorly received OK Soda). Pabst instead targets its desired market niche through the sponsorship of indie music, local businesses, post-collegiate sports teams, dive bars and radio programming like National Public Radio's All Things Considered. The company encourages the online submission of fan art, which is subsequently shown on the beer's official Facebook page.

Beginning in 2021, Pabst began supporting professional wrestling (in particular the independent circuit) after becoming a sponsor for Matt Cardona's podcast. It eventually led to the beer's first major television commercial in decades during the August 4, 2021 broadcast of AEW Dynamite, after it volunteered to step in to replace Domino's Pizza as a sponsor of All Elite Wrestling following backlash from Domino's when Nick Gage used a pizza cutter on Chris Jericho in a deathmatch on the previous week's Dynamite, with said spot immediately airing before a Domino's commercial.

In January 2022, the brand's Twitter account tweeted "Not drinking this January? Try eating ass!", a reference to Dry January. The tweet and a number of follow up replies were eventually deleted and the company released a statement apologizing for the incident. The brand manager who wrote the tweet was fired.

Products 
Pabst Blue Ribbon Original is the brand flagship and is brewed at 4.8% ABV. There is also Pabst Blue Ribbon Extra which is described as a 6.5% ABV full bodied lager. Pabst Blue Ribbon Easy is the brand's light-style lager with lower calories and an ABV of 3.8%. Pabst Blue Ribbon Non-Alc is billed as their non alcoholic option, but as with all "non-alcoholic" beers it does retain a slight alcoholic content of less than 0.5% ABV.

Besides beer, the company offers other drinks under the Pabst Blue Ribbon brand name.

Their hard coffee is a 5% ABV canned coffee described as being made with milk and vanilla. They also have a low calorie hard tea at 4%. The brand offers two "stronger" seltzers, lime and wild berry, with a relatively high ABV of 8%.

They also offer an 80 proof (40% ABV) white whiskey.

In popular culture
In 1973, American country music artist Johnny Russell recorded, "Rednecks, White Socks, and Blue Ribbon Beer," a song written by Bob McDill and Wayland Holyfield.

In the 1980 Martin Scorsese film Raging Bull, during a fight, Pabst Blue Ribbon has an advertisement that says "And the next time that friendly bartender says, "What'll you have?" Give him that answer the whole world gives, "Pabst Blue Ribbon" 

In the 1986 David Lynch film Blue Velvet, the character Frank Booth asks main character Jeffrey Beaumont for his favorite beer. Beaumont answers by saying Heineken, to which Booth gets infuriated; shouting "Pabst Blue Ribbon" at him.

In the Route of All Evil episode of Futurama, a parody called Pabst Blue Robot is mentioned by Bender as his favorite beer.

Pabst Blue Ribbon is sometimes featured (in a negative context) in the popular TV show South Park.

In Marvel Comics "Savage Avengers", there are a number of in jokes attributed to Wolverine, who describes himself to Conan the Barbarian as "Logan ... of Pabst". Conan, being a time displaced warrior, takes Logan (and his love of Pabst beer) literally and refers to Wolverine and Pabst in the same context. For example, in issue #2 of "Savage Avengers" Wolverine faints from blood loss as the heroes face off against a large group of enemies. Trying to awaken and inspire his friend, Conan picks up Wolverine and shakes him, yelling for the mutant super hero to wake up, "..for Pabst!", presumably to upkeep the honour of Pabst.

References

External links
 
 PBR Alcohol Content
 A souvenir booklet from the Pabst Brewing Company, 1907, Wisconsin Historical Society

1844 introductions
American beer brands
Pabst Brewing Company
World's Columbian Exposition